Glom (fl. 528) was a Hun sub-king, or tribe king. He fought for the Sasanian Empire in the late 520s.

Biography
Glom was a king of a section of the Huns. He became an ally of Persian king Kavad I and in 528 fought for him against the queen of the Hunnish tribe of the Sabirs, a woman named Boa (Boarez/Boarek), the widow of Balaq. He was defeated by Boa while marching to aid the Persians against the Romans.

Etymology
His name might be of Iranian origin.

References

Sources

Hun military leaders
Persian people of Hunnic descent
Huns from the Sasanian Empire